Landen Allen Lucas (born October 3, 1993) is an American professional basketball player for APOEL B.C. of the Cyprus Basketball Division A. Lucas played college basketball at Kansas.

High school career
Began his high school career at Sunset High School in Portland, moved to Findlay Prep in Henderson, Nevada as a junior and was back in Portland at Westview High School for his senior season. At Findlay Prep, Lucas averaged 6.0 points, 6.0 rebounds and 2.0 blocked shots per game. He averaged 21.0 points, 14.0 rebounds and 4.0 blocks per game as a senior at Westview High School. Recorded his best game as a senior when he scored 32 points, pulled down 22 rebounds and blocked 11 shots.
Landen was rated a three-star recruit by Rivals.com.

College career
As a sophomore, Lucas averaged 3.5 points and 4.3 rebounds per game and made 14 starts. Lucas averaged 5.8 points per game as a junior at Kansas. In the offseason, he worked on his offensive game with former Jayhawk Wayne Simien. Lucas scored a career-high 18 points to go with 12 rebounds in a 90-88 win against Kansas State on January 4, 2017. As a senior, Lucas was an All-Big 12 Honorable Mention. He averaged 8.0 points and 8.3 rebounds per game on a team that finished 31-5.

Professional career

Alvark Tokyo (2017–2018)
Lucas worked out for several NBA teams prior to the 2017 NBA draft but went undrafted. Later Lucas played for the Boston Celtics in the NBA Summer League. In July 2017, Lucas joined Alvark Tokyo of the Japanese B.League. Lucas already speaks Japanese, having lived in the country in his youth.

Kalev/Cramo (2018)
On September 3, 2018, Lucas signed a trial contract with Kalev/Cramo of the Estonian league. In November, the team announced that he would not be retained on a permanent contract. 

On January 14, 2019, Antwerp Giants of the Belgian Pro Basketball League announced that Lucas would be joining the team for the remainder of the season.  He did not pass his physical and did not play for the Giants.

APOEL B.C. (2020–2021)
After taking a year off from professional basketball, Lucas signed with APOEL B.C. of the Cyprus Basketball Division A on September 30, 2020.

International career
Lucas and the Kansas Jayhawks competed on behalf of the United States in the 2015 World University Games.

References

External links
Kansas Jayhawks bio

1993 births
Living people
Alvark Tokyo players
American expatriate basketball people in Estonia
American expatriate basketball people in Japan
American men's basketball players
Basketball players from Portland, Oregon
BC Kalev/Cramo players
Centers (basketball)
Findlay Prep alumni
Kansas Jayhawks men's basketball players
Power forwards (basketball)
Sunset High School (Beaverton, Oregon) alumni
Universiade gold medalists for the United States
Universiade medalists in basketball
Medalists at the 2015 Summer Universiade